Thomas P. Morgan (December 1, 1864 - 1928) was an American writer, editor, poet, and columnist. 


Biography

Morgan was born in East Lyme, Connecticut to Joseph P. Morgan. He moved to Rogers, Arkansas in 1890.

He began his career as an actor and circus clown before moving west and operating a book and stationery business in Rogers, Arkansas.

He wrote for various periodicals including Harper's Magazine, Ladies Home Journal and Puck as well as a playwright. He became nationally known for his comedic tales of country folk life employing quirky characters and vernacular dialogue.  He was friendly with Will Rogers and his wife Betty. He sometimes used the pen name Tennyson J. Daft.

Morgan also wrote plays but is better known for his humorous short stories.

He wrote a daily humor column for the Kansas City Star for many years.

He spent his later years in Arkansas.

Bibliography
Short stories and wit of Tom P. Morgan: Late of Rogers, Arkansas, Compiled by J. Dickson Black

References

Further reading
New York Times obituary, July 8, 1928, page 21, column 3.
“Mystery of Tom P. Morgan is Resolved” by Billie Jines, Northwest Arkansas Morning News, May 3, 1987, p. 1B.
“Memories of Tom P. Morgan” by Vera Key, Benton County Pioneer 1 (August 1956): 8–10.
Obituary of Tom P. Morgan. Rogers Democrat. July 12, 1928, p. 1.
Tom P. Morgan Research File. Research Library. Rogers Historical Museum, Rogers, Arkansas.
Who's Who, XII to XVI by Fred W. Allsopp, Poets and Poetry of Arkansas, Little Rock, 1922, page 109
 Journalist, Volume VIII, November 10, 1888, 2, XI, August 9, 1890
Editor and Publisher, Volume LXI, July 14, 1928

1864 births
1928 deaths
American humorists
19th-century American poets
American clowns
People from East Lyme, Connecticut
20th-century American short story writers
Poets from Arkansas
Poets from Connecticut
American male short story writers
American male dramatists and playwrights
People from Rogers, Arkansas
19th-century American dramatists and playwrights
20th-century American male writers
19th-century American male writers
American magazine editors
The Kansas City Star people
19th-century American male actors
American male stage actors
20th-century American poets
American male poets
19th-century American short story writers
American columnists